Axel Bellinghausen (born 17 May 1983) is a retired German footballer and current assistant manager of Fortuna Düsseldorf.

Career
Born in Siegburg, North Rhine-Westphalia he started at the age of five playing football at TuS 05 Oberpleis. In 1993, when he was ten years old, he went to Bayer 04 Leverkusen. He left Bayer 04 Leverkusen five years later to play for Fortuna Düsseldorf where he became a professional football player in 2001.

Honours
Augsburg
2. Bundesliga runner-up: 2010–11

References

External links
 

1983 births
Living people
People from Siegburg
Sportspeople from Cologne (region)
German footballers
Association football midfielders
Bundesliga players
2. Bundesliga players
Fortuna Düsseldorf players
1. FC Kaiserslautern players
FC Augsburg players
Footballers from North Rhine-Westphalia